Dawn Cavanagh is a South African activist and feminist.

Early life and education 
Dawn Cavanagh was born on 23 March 1962. She attended Fairvale Senior Secondary School in Wentworth, KwaZulu-Natal, and graduated from the University of Natal with a Bachelor of Science degree in social work in 1982.  She received a Bachelor of Arts degree in social work from the University of South Africa in 1996 and studied for a master's degree in development studies from the University of Natal.

Career 
Cavanagh has worked for the Forum for the Empowerment of Women, the first black lesbian rights organization in South Africa, and Oxfam.

Cavanagh is active in South Africa in the fields of equal access to healthcare, HIV/AIDS activism, women's rights, sexual rights, and reproductive rights.  She helped to found the Coalition of African Lesbians in 2004 and became director in 2010. In 2014 Cavanagh set up the Masakhane (Zulu for "Come, let's get stronger together") programme with the German LSVD to provide better networking and empowerment to lesbian, bisexual and transgender women in sub-Saharan Africa.

She has led trainings at Civil Rights Defenders' Defenders' Days, for Akina Mama wa Afrika's African Women’s Leadership Institute, and for the Women's Leadership Centre in Namibia.

Cavanagh has also worked with and been promoted by AWID.

Publications 

 "Losing the Beijing Agenda in the Sea of 'New Solutions' to HIV and AIDS" (2005), in Agenda: Empowering Women for Gender Equity.

References 

1962 births
Living people
South African feminists
South African women's rights activists
Lesbian feminists
South African lesbians
South African LGBT rights activists
Place of birth missing (living people)
21st-century South African LGBT people